The Old Zurich War, 1440–46, was a conflict between the canton of Zurich and the other seven cantons of the Old Swiss Confederacy over the succession to the Count of Toggenburg.

In 1436, Count Friedrich VII of Toggenburg died, leaving neither heir nor will. The canton of Zurich, led by burgomaster Rudolf Stüssi, claimed the Toggenburg lands; the cantons of Schwyz and Glarus made counter-claims, backed by the other cantons. In 1438 Zurich occupied the disputed area and cut off grain supplies to Schwyz and Glarus. In 1440, the other cantons expelled Zurich from the confederation and declared war. Zurich retaliated by making an alliance with Frederick III, Holy Roman Emperor of the house of Habsburg.

The forces of Zurich were defeated in the Battle of St. Jakob an der Sihl on 22 July 1443 and Zurich was besieged. Frederick appealed to Charles VII of France to attack the confederates and the latter sent a force of about 30,000 Armagnac mercenaries under the command of the Dauphin via Basel to relieve the city.  In the Battle of St. Jakob an der Birs near Basel on 26 August 1444 a blocking force of roughly 1,600 Swiss confederates was defeated, but inflicted such heavy losses on the French (2,000 killed) that the Dauphin decided to retreat. The confederacy and the Dauphin concluded a peace in October 1444, and his mercenary army withdrew from the war altogether.

In May 1444, the confederacy laid siege to Greifensee, and captured the town after four weeks, on May 27, beheading all but two of the 64 defenders the next day, including their leader, Wildhans von Breitenlandenberg, the so-called Murder of Greifensee. Even in this time of war, such a mass execution was widely considered a cruel and unjust deed.

By 1446, both sides were exhausted, and a preliminary peace was concluded. The confederation had not managed to conquer any of the cities of Zurich except Greifensee; Rapperswil and Zurich itself withstood the attacks. In 1450, the parties made a definitive peace and Zurich was admitted into the confederation again, but had to dissolve its alliance with the Habsburgs.

The significance of the war is that it showed that the confederation had grown into a political alliance so close that it no longer tolerated separatist tendencies of a single member.

See also
Battles of the Old Swiss Confederacy
Johannes Fründ

References

Werner Meyer: Battle of St. Jakob an der Birs in German, French and Italian in the online Historical Dictionary of Switzerland, 2012.

Civil wars in Switzerland
Civil wars of the Middle Ages
History of Zürich
Toggenburg
Counts of Toggenburg
Wars of succession involving the states and peoples of Europe
1440s conflicts
15th century in the Old Swiss Confederacy
1440s in the Holy Roman Empire
15th-century military history of France